Kris Adams (born September 4, 1987) is an American football wide receiver who is currently a free agent. He was signed as an undrafted free agent in 2011 by the Chicago Bears. He has also been a member of the St. Louis Rams,    Minnesota Vikings, and Indianapolis Colts.

Professional career

Chicago Bears
On July 26, 2011, Adams was signed by the Chicago Bears as an undrafted free agent. On September 3, 2011, Adams was waived by the Bears. He cleared waivers and was placed on the Bears' practice squad. On October 11, 2011, he was released from the Bears' practice squad.

St. Louis Rams
On October 18, 2011, Adams was signed to the St. Louis Rams’ practice squad. He was released from the Rams’ practice squad on November 8, 2011.

Minnesota Vikings
On December 14, 2011, the Minnesota Vikings signed Adams to the practice squad. On January 2, 2012, the Vikings signed Adams to a reserve/future contract. He was waived by the Vikings on May 14, 2012.

Indianapolis Colts
On June 5, 2012, Adams was signed by the Indianapolis Colts. On October 6, 2012, Adams was waived by the Colts. On October 8, 2012, he was re-signed and placed on the practice squad.

New York Giants
On January 15, 2013, Adams signed a reserve/future contract with the New York Giants. On August 10, 2013, in the Giants' first preseason game against the Pittsburgh Steelers, Adams suffered a fractured lower leg. On August 12, 2013, he was waived/injured by the Giants. He cleared waivers and was placed on the Giants' injured reserve list. On July 30, 2014, he was listed as Reserve/Injured.

See also
 List of NCAA major college football yearly receiving leaders

References

External links
 Minnesota Vikings bio page
 New York Giants bio page

Living people
1987 births
Players of American football from Fort Worth, Texas
UTEP Miners football players
American football wide receivers
Minnesota Vikings players
Indianapolis Colts players
Winnipeg Blue Bombers players